The 2019–20 Cornell Big Red men's basketball team represented Cornell University in the 2019–20 NCAA Division I men's basketball season. The Big Red, led by fourth-year head coach Brian Earl, played their home games at Newman Arena in Ithaca, New York as members of the Ivy League. They finished the season 7–20, 4–10 in Ivy League play to finish in seventh place. They failed to qualify for the Ivy League tournament, although the tournament was ultimately cancelled due to the COVID-19 pandemic.

Previous season
The Big Red finished the 2018–19 season 15–16 overall, 7–7 in Ivy League play, to finish in a three-way tie for fourth place. Due to tiebreakers, they failed to qualify for the Ivy League tournament. They were invited to the CIT, where they were defeated by Robert Morris in the first round.

Roster

Schedule and results

|-
!colspan=12 style=|  

|-
!colspan=9 style=|  

|-

Source

References

Cornell Big Red men's basketball seasons
Cornell Big Red
Cornell Big Red men's basketball
Cornell Big Red men's basketball